The office of vice president of the Socialist Federal Republic of Yugoslavia existed from April 1963 to June 1967. It was established by the new Yugoslav Constitution adopted on 7 April 1963. The first to serve in the role was Aleksandar Ranković who assumed office on 30 June 1963. Due to an affair involving wire-tapping of Yugoslav president and general secretary of the League of Communists Josip Broz Tito, Ranković was forced to resign from the Central Committee and from the vice presidency on 1 July 1966. He was subsequently replaced by Koča Popović two weeks later who served out the remainder of Ranković's four-year term. On 26 April 1967 new amendments to the 1963 constitution were approved which disestablished the vice presidency once Ranković and Popović's combined four-year term was up. The office ceased to exist on 30 June 1967.

List of vice presidents

See also
Vice President of the Presidency of Yugoslavia
List of heads of state of Yugoslavia
President of Yugoslavia

References

Vice President of Yugoslavia
Vice presidents of Yugoslavia
Yugoslavia
1963 establishments in Yugoslavia
1967 disestablishments in Europe